Wes Naiqama (born 19 October 1982) is a Fijian Australian former professional rugby league footballer who last played for the London Broncos in the English Championship. He won 14 caps for the Fiji national rugby league team. He is the older brother of Huddersfield Giants player and fellow Fiji international, Kevin Naiqama.

Background
Naiqama was born in Sutherland, New South Wales, Australia.

Playing career

Early career
Naiqama played his junior football for the Arncliffe Scots and attended James Cook Boys Technology High School before being signed by the St. George Illawarra Dragons. In 2002, he scored 38 points, 5 tries and 9 goals in a Jersey Flegg game for the St. George club against the North Sydney Bears.

St. George Illawarra Dragons
In Round 4 of the 2005 NRL season he made his NRL debut for St. George Illawarra against the Canberra Raiders.  Naiqama played 20 games for the club in his debut season including their shock preliminary final loss against the Wests Tigers.  The following year, he was limited to only nine games but he did feature in the clubs finals campaign which reached the preliminary final stage before they were defeated 24-10 by Melbourne.  In his final year at the club, Naiqama was once again limited to only nine appearances.

Newcastle Knights
In 2007, Naiqama signed a contract with the Newcastle Knights starting in 2008, to be a part of the new Brian Smith era at the Newcastle outfit. In 2008, Naiqama regularly started in the centres or at fullback. He was also chosen as the replacement goal kicker after Kurt Gidley. He was frequently used as a bench utility player in 2009 and 2010 before gaining his spot back in the starting team in 2011, playing in career best form as a centre or fullback. In Round 16 of the 2011 season, Naiqama got the chance to captain the Newcastle Knights for the first time after captain Kurt Gidley and vice-captain Jarrod Mullen were both injured at the same time. He again was named captain in Round 17. In June 2011, after career best form, Naiqama re-signed with the Newcastle side for three-years after rejecting a contract with his former club, the St. George Illawarra Dragons. In 2012, after injuries and form loss, Naiqama was demoted to the NSW Cup after Round 9 by new head coach Wayne Bennett.

Penrith Panthers
On 13 July 2012, Naiqama was released from the remaining two years of his contract with the Newcastle Knights and signed a two-year contract with the Penrith Panthers starting in 2013.

London Broncos
On 27 August 2014, Naiqama signed a two-year contract with the London Broncos in the 2015 Kingstone Press Championship.  On 21 December 2015, Naiqama became the captain of London Broncos.

Representative career
Naiqama made his Fiji debut in 2006. In 2008, Naiqama was named in the Fiji squad for the 2008 Rugby League World Cup.

On 3 November 2011, the annual RLIF Awards dinner was held at the Tower of London and Naiqama was named Fiji's Player of the Year.

He was named vice-captain for Fiji's 2013 Rugby League World Cup campaign.

In October 2014, Naiqama captained Fiji in their Hayne/Mannah Cup test match against Lebanon.

Personal life
In December 2006, Naiqama was arrested but not charged over an alleged assault in Sydney's King Cross.

His relationship with Australian/Fijian pop star Paulini Curuenavuli ended in 2006 with domestic violence speculations, and the singer has admitted to writing a song about the situation and abuse.

On 28 February 2007, Naiqama was convicted by a Sydney court for driving a car while his license was disqualified. The court sentenced Naiqama to serve a maximum of eight months periodic detention, with a non-parole period of four months. This was the fourth time Naiqama had been convicted of such an offence.

References

External links

London Broncos profile
2012 Newcastle Knights profile

1982 births
Living people
Australian people convicted of assault
Australian people of I-Taukei Fijian descent
Australian rugby league players
Australian expatriate sportspeople in England
Fiji national rugby league team captains
Fiji national rugby league team players
Fijian rugby league coaches
Fijian rugby league players
Kaiviti Silktails coaches
London Broncos captains
London Broncos players
Nelson Bay Blues players
Newcastle Knights captains
Newcastle Knights players
Penrith Panthers players
People from the Sutherland Shire
Rugby league centres
Rugby league fullbacks
Rugby league players from Sydney
Rugby league second-rows
Rugby league wingers
Sportsmen from New South Wales
St. George Illawarra Dragons players